Marinus Jacobus Hendricus Michels (9 February 1928 – 3 March 2005) was a Dutch football player and coach. He played his entire career for AFC Ajax, which he later managed, and played for and later managed the Netherlands national team for four spells. He is regarded as one of the greatest managers of all-time. 

Michels became most notable for his coaching achievements; he won the European Cup with Ajax and the Spanish league with Barcelona, and had four tenures as coach of the Netherlands national team, who he led to reach the final of the 1974 FIFA World Cup and to win the 1988 UEFA European Championship.

He is credited with the invention of a major football playing style and set of tactics known as "Total Football" in the 1970s. He was named Coach of the Century by FIFA in 1999, in 2007 the greatest post-war football coach by The Times and in 2019 the greatest coach in the history of football by France Football.

Playing career

Early life
Michels was born in Amsterdam and grew up at the Olympiaweg, a street near the Olympic Stadium. He celebrated his ninth birthday on 9 February 1937, when he received a pair of football boots and an Ajax jersey. Moments later, he was playing with his father at a small field near their home. Via Joop Köhler, a friend of the family who was commissioner at Ajax, Michels was introduced to the club and became a junior member in 1940. When World War II started, and especially during the Dutch famine of 1944–45, Michels' career was set on hold.

French club Lille had also wanted to contract Michels, but a playing career abroad did not materialize as the Royal Netherlands Army did not allow him to go because he had to serve on active duty.

Ajax first team

On 9 June 1946, Michels was invited into Ajax's first team squad to replace the injured Han Lambregt. In his debut, Ajax beat ADO 8–3 and Michels scored five times. That season, Ajax won their 14th division championship and a year later they won the Dutch national championship. Although there were doubts about Michels' technical skills, team members like Cor van der Hart and captain Joop Stoffelen were enthusiastic about his strength and heading capabilities. Indeed, Michels was characterized for his hard work rather than for his technical qualities.

He went on to become a regular for the club, and between 1946 and 1958, he appeared in 264 league matches for Ajax, in which he scored 122 goals. In 1958, four years after the introduction of professional football in the Netherlands and one year after winning his second league title, he was forced to end his career due to a back injury.

National team
Michels' international playing career with the Netherlands national team lasted five matches, making his debut on 8 June 1950 away to Sweden, a 4–1 defeat. He also lost all of his remaining matches as an Oranje player, 4–1 to Finland, 4–0 to Belgium, 6–1 to Sweden and 3–1 to Switzerland.

Coaching career

Early years in the Netherlands, Ajax, and Barcelona

Michels returned to Ajax as head coach in 1965. Under his tenure and along with great players such as Johan Cruyff and Johan Neeskens, Ajax went from relegation candidates to a team that won the national championship four times and the KNVB Cup three times in the following six years. In 1969, they reached the final of the European Cup for the first time, being defeated 4–1 by Italian side Milan. In 1971, he managed Ajax to the first of three consecutive European Cups, a feat only achieved previously by the great Real Madrid team of Alfredo Di Stéfano and Ferenc Puskás. While at Ajax, Michels modernized the game by introducing what became known as "Total Football" and using the Offside trap. He then moved to Barcelona in the second part of 1971, being joined by Johan Cruyff in 1973. With Michels and Cruyff, the team won the Primera División title in 1974 before Michels became manager of the Dutch national team.

1974 World Cup
Michels was appointed national coach by the Royal Dutch Football Association (KNVB) after the Netherlands had qualified for the 1974 FIFA World Cup. His first game as the Netherlands' coach was on 27 March 1974 in a 1–1 draw against Austria. At the finals tournament in Germany, their third ever World Cup participation, the Dutch impressed many observers with their style of play which was backed up by their results; they won their first round group, then in the second round group they defeated Argentina and the defending world champions Brazil, and reached the final after five wins and one draw, with 14 goals scored and only one conceded in six matches. At that point, Michels was undefeated in nine matches as the Netherlands' coach. The Netherlands scored first against West Germany in the final, but the host team came back to defeat them 2–1, ending their run. That match was the last of Michels' first tenure in charge of the Dutch team, which he would return to coach ten years later.

Later years
Michels later moved on to the United States where he coached in the ill-fated North American Soccer League. He ended his club coaching career with Bayer Leverkusen in 1989. He had his jour de gloire, however, when he coached the Dutch team to European glory at the 1988 UEFA European Championship.

European champions

Michels returned to coach the team for the Euro 1988 tournament. After losing the first group match against the Soviet Union (1–0), the Netherlands went on to qualify for the semi-final by defeating England 3–1 (with a hat-trick by the tournament's top scorer Marco van Basten), and the Republic of Ireland (1–0). For many Dutch football supporters, the most important match in the tournament was the semi-final against West Germany, the host country, considered a revenge for the lost 1974 World Cup final (also in West Germany). Michels said after the match, "We won the tournament, but we all know that the semi-final was the real final." Van Basten, who would later become national team coach, scored in the 89th minute of the game to sink the German side. The game is also remembered for its post-match shenanigans, including Ronald Koeman, who, in front of the German supporters, provocatively pretended to wipe his backside with the shirt of Olaf Thon as if it were toilet paper, an action Koeman later did not regret. The Netherlands won the final with a convincing victory over the Soviet Union, a rematch on the round robin game, through a header by Ruud Gullit and a remarkable volley by Van Basten. This was the national team's first, and to date only, major tournament win and it restored them to the forefront of international football after almost a decade in the wilderness for almost three years to come.

Death
Michels died on 3 March 2005 at a hospital in Aalst, Belgium, after a heart surgery in the hospital of Gareth, Spain (his second since 1986).

Style of management, personality and legacy
Regarded as one of the greatest managers of all time, Rinus Michels's tactics and Total football philosophy were influenced by his time playing under English manager Jack Reynolds at Ajax, who had implemented a similar playing style with the club to great success in the 1940s. When Michels himself later became manager of Ajax in 1965, he further developed this style around the team's main forward Johan Cruyff. Although Cruyff was seemingly fielded as centre forward, Michels encouraged Cruyff to roam freely around the pitch, using his technical ability, creativity, and intelligence to exploit the weaknesses in the opposition and create space and chances in addition to scoring goals. Cruyff's teammates also supported him by playing him in a similar manner, regularly switching positions to ensure that the tactical roles in the team were consistently filled. This role has retroactively been compared to the "false 9" position in contemporary football.

The major component of football was the use of space, and the need to consistently create it. Former Ajax defender Barry Hulshoff described it as "[the thing] we discussed the whole time. Cruyff always talked about where to run and where to stand, and when not to move". He further elaborated that position switching was only made possible due to apt spatial awareness. He also described Total Football being proactive, as well as highlighting the use of pressing, which would be used to win back the ball or put the opposition under considerable pressure. Another aspect of the system was the use of the offside trap. Under Michels's system, Ajax enjoyed a highly successful period, winning four Eredivisie titles, three KNVB Cups, and one European Cup. 

The rise of Total Football and its attacking qualities were also linked with the demise of the more defensive–minded Catenaccio, a system reliant heavily on man-marking and counter–attacking, which was promoted most prominently by Italian sides Internazionale and Milan during the 1960s under Helenio Herrera and Nereo Rocco Respectively. Unlike previous systems, in Total Football, no out–field player was fixed in their nominal role, which exposed weaknesses in the catenaccio tactical system; any player could assume the role of a forward, midfielder, or defender, at any given time depending on the circumstances. Due to players often switching positions with one another, man-marking strategies, such as catenaccio, were no longer effective at coping with this highly fluid tactical system. Despite previously losing out 4–1 to Milan in the 1969 European Cup Final, who were managed by Rocco, a manager known for his defensive catenaccio strategy, in 1972, Michels's Ajax defeated Inter 2–0 in the European Cup final, and Dutch newspapers subsequently announced the "destruction of Catenaccio" at the hands of Total Football. The following year, Ajax defeated Cesare Maldini's Milan 6–0 in the second leg of the European Super Cup, in a match in which the defensive catenaccio system employed by Milan was unable to stop Ajax, which saw the Dutch side win the title 6–1 on aggregate; this was the worst defeat for an Italian team in an UEFA competition final.

Total football also had some weaknesses, however, which were notably exploited in the final of the 1974 FIFA World Cup by West Germany. Michels and Cruyff saw their ability to introduce playmaking stifled in the second half of the match by the effective marking of Berti Vogts. This allowed Franz Beckenbauer, Uli Hoeneß, and Wolfgang Overath to gain a stronghold in midfield, thus, enabling West Germany to win 2–1. Moreover, as man-marking alone was insufficient to cope with the fluidity of total football, Italian coaches consequently began to create a new tactical system that mixed man-marking with zonal defence in order to counter this strategy, which came to be known as zona mista ("mixed zone," in Italian), or gioco all'italiana ("gameplay in the Italian manner," in Italian), in Italian football, as it mixed elements of Italian catenaccio (man-marking) with elements of total football (zonal marking), with Giovanni Trapattoni as one its main and most successful proponents from the 1970s onward.

Michels became known as a person who was keen on his money and did not want to spend much of it. A common joke in the Ajax changing rooms in those days was, "Does anybody actually know the color of Michels' wallet?". His IQ was high and during foreign trips he always brought a book with him, which he wanted to have read completely before coming home. He was known as someone who did not need anybody and who felt happy on his own, but sometimes he joined his teammates and shared their enthusiastic friendships. At the celebrations of Ajax' 50th birthday in 1950, he was the organizer of the humoristic show that was held and during traditional parties he and his friend Hans Boskamp climbed up the stages to sing some duets. After matches, he was always soaping himself down in the showers of the changing rooms as well, even when the match was lost.

Michels was also known as a practical joker. At a hotel he once borrowed a fur coat of a lady and pretended to be a lady to his teammates. During a training session in Lille, the players went fishing and Michels, who did not enjoy himself, jumped into the water.

Due to his authoritarian style as coach, Michels was called "The General". He said, "Professional football is something like war. Whoever behaves too properly, is lost." This has often been misquoted as "Football is war." Michels felt the quote was taken out of context as he did not intend to equate war with football. Michels was named coach of the century by FIFA in 1999.

The Rinus Michels Award, which rewards the best managers in Dutch football, is named in his honour.

Quotes
 Professional football is something like war. Whoever behaves too properly, is lost. Often misquoted in the form "Football is war".
 It is an art in itself to compose a starting team, finding the balance between creative players and those with destructive powers, and between defence, construction and attack – never forgetting the quality of the opposition and the specific pressures of each match.

About Michels
 "Both as a player and as a trainer there is nobody who taught me as much as him. I will miss Rinus Michels. ... I always greatly admired his leadership." – Johan Cruyff

Career statistics

Player

Managerial

Netherlands

Honours

Player
Ajax
Eredivisie: 1946–47, 1956–57

Manager
Ajax
Eredivisie: 1965–66, 1966–67, 1967–68, 1969–70
KNVB Cup: 1966–67, 1969–70, 1970–71
European Cup: 1970–71; Runner-up: 1968–69

Barcelona
La Liga: 1973–74
Copa del Rey: 1977–78
Inter-Cities Fairs Cup Trophy: 1971

1. FC Köln
DFB Pokal: 1982–83

Netherlands
UEFA European Championship: 1988
FIFA World Cup Runner-up: 1974
Individual
 World Soccer Awards Manager of the Year: 1988
 Berlin-Britz Manager of the Decade (1970s)
 FIFA Coach of the Century: 1999
 France Football Greatest Manager of All time: 2019
 World Soccer 2nd Greatest Manager of All Time: 2013
 ESPN 2nd Greatest Manager of All Time: 2013
 Dutch Manager of the Century: 1999
 UEFA Lifetime Award: 2002
 Best Manager in 50 years of professional football in the Netherlands: 2004
Orders
 Invested as a Knight of the Order of Orange-Nassau: 1974
 Elevated as an Officer of the Order of Orange-Nassau: 1988
 Named Knight of the KNVB: 2002

References

External links

 Sven Goran Erikson's tribute to Rinus Michels (3 March 2005)
 The Times ranking of the 50 greatest post-war coaches
 France Football ranking of the 50 greatest coaches in football history
 

1928 births
2005 deaths
Footballers from Amsterdam
Dutch footballers
Association football forwards
AFC Ajax players
Eredivisie players
Netherlands international footballers
Dutch football managers
AFC DWS managers
AFC Ajax managers
FC Barcelona managers
Netherlands national football team managers
1. FC Köln managers
Bayer 04 Leverkusen managers
Eerste Divisie managers
Eredivisie managers
La Liga managers
North American Soccer League (1968–1984) coaches
Bundesliga managers
UEFA Champions League winning managers
1974 FIFA World Cup managers
UEFA Euro 1988 managers
UEFA Euro 1992 managers
UEFA European Championship-winning managers
Dutch expatriate football managers
Dutch expatriate sportspeople in Spain
Dutch expatriate sportspeople in the United States
Dutch expatriate sportspeople in Germany
Expatriate football managers in Spain
Expatriate soccer managers in the United States
Expatriate football managers in Germany
Knights of the Order of Orange-Nassau
Officers of the Order of Orange-Nassau
JOS Watergraafsmeer managers
Royal Netherlands Army personnel